Polytech School District is a public school district in Kent County, Delaware, United States. It includes Polytech High School and the Polytech adult education program.

References

External links
 Polytech School District website
 Polytech Adult Education website
 Polytech High school website

School districts in Kent County, Delaware